Grzegorz Strouhal (31 December 1942 – 15 January 2016) was a Polish sports shooter. He competed in the trap event at the 1972 Summer Olympics.

References

1942 births
2016 deaths
Polish male sport shooters
Olympic shooters of Poland
Shooters at the 1972 Summer Olympics
People from Lipno County
Sportspeople from Kuyavian-Pomeranian Voivodeship